South Valley Regional Airport   is a public airport located in West Jordan,  southwest of Salt Lake City, Utah, United States. Established as a Utah World War II army airfield, it is the primary general aviation airport in the area and is a Utah Army National Guard training base with Apache and Blackhawk helicopters. Leading Edge Aviation is the single fixed-base operator (FBO) onsite; the FBO and Alta Aircraft Maintenance operate maintenance facilities, and the FBO and Utah Helicopter Flight Academy operate flight schools.

History
On 10 February 1942, the United States district engineer (Colonel E. G. Thomas) recommended a "5,450-acre dry farming area in Kearns" for an inland Army training site. For one of "the eight new technical training installations rushed into operation" during 1942–3, a Kearns, Utah "plot of 1,405 acres was purchased". The Kearns Center military unit was activated (designated) 1 May 1942, and "a contract for a theater of operations cantonment was let" on 16 June 1942. "Basic Training Center No. 5" began operations on 17 July and opened on 20 July under Training Command. A "Denver and Rio Grande Western" spur was built to the installation's railroad station, and by 21 August all barracks were complete. "Upon completion of their basic training most of the pre-aviation cadets [were] sent to one of the many college operated [flight schools] under the supervision of the Army Air , known as the Civilian Pilot Training Program. The 510th Training Group and three technical school squadrons (1032d, 1033d, and 1034th) were assigned to Kearns on 10 September 1942, and Kearns' commander, Colonel Leo F. Post, arrived by September 12. Construction was completed in October 1942 and Kearns' "basic military training and technical training" continued until 30 September 1943.

Kearns Army Air Field
Kearns Army Air Field was the flight facility constructed on the larger base and was used by 9 B-24 Liberator bombardment groups – 459th, 460th, 455th, 456th, 465th, 466th, 467th, 458th and from Gowen Field, 461st, formed 31 August17 October 1943. The base transferred to Second Air Force on 1 October 1943, and the bomb groups all were reassigned by the end of 1943 (e.g., the 461st to Wendover Field). In January 1944, Kearns AAF began performing personnel replacement training, rather than group training. In April, ground echelon training for B-24 support personnel was ended.

Camp Kearns
In April 1944, "Camp Kearns" was returned to the Western Technical Training Command when the WTTC's Fort Logan in Colorado transferred to the Air Service Command. On 1 July 1944 Camp Kearns transferred to AAF Personnel Distribution Command.

A theater for "colored personnel" became part of Kearns Junior High School. A base chapel is now part of Our Lady of Perpetual Help Catholic Church. The base train station is a day-care center. A cannon that had stood next to the headquarters' flagpole stood for many years at the corner of 40th West and 54th South.

The World War I-era cannon and flagpole from the old Camp Kearns military base have been relocated to the Kearns township recreation center. They are now part of the new Kearns Veterans Memorial Plaza, dedicated 10 November 2012.

Army Air Base, Kearns
Redesignated Army Air Base, Kearns on 1 October 1944 when transferred to the Second Air Force, command of the base transferred from Converse R. Lewis to Colonel Walter F. Siegmund.

Both the "Overseas Replacement Depot, Kearns, Utah" and "Salt Lake City Army Air Field under command jurisdiction of Kearns ORD" transferred to Strategic Air Command on 21 March 1946. Kearns ORD and SLC AAFld (along with North Carolina's Greensboro ORD and the Greensboro-High Point Army Airfield)transferred to AAFTC on 30 April and Kearns finally transferred to Air Defense Command (31 July). The base (including Kearns AAF) was inactivated on 15 August 1946 and transferred to the War Assets Administration for disposal. The War Assets Administration declared Kearns surplus on 24 January 1947, and the high bid by Standard Surplus was opened in July 1948 for the  installation with only 100 remaining buildings. A "Camp Kearns Memorial" was emplaced at the Arlo D. James Kearns Veterans Memorial Park (later moved to ).

Since World War II
After World War II, control of the airport was turned over to Salt Lake City and it was renamed Salt Lake City Municipal Airport II. On 10 February 2009, the Salt Lake City Council voted to change the airport's name to South Valley Regional Airport. The council made the change in order to more clearly describe the location and function of the airport and because the traditional name of "Airport II" had "no historical significance."

See also

 Skywest Airlines Flight 1834
 Utah World War II Army Airfields
 Western Technical Training Command

References

External links

 South Valley Regional Airport (on Salt Lake City International Airport's website)

1943 establishments in Utah
Airports established in 1943
Airports in Utah
Transportation in Salt Lake County, Utah
Airfields of the United States Army Air Forces in Utah
Buildings and structures in West Jordan, Utah